Peter Joseph Connors (born 6 March 1937) is an Australian prelate of the Catholic Church who served as Bishop of Ballarat from 1997 to 2012.

Biography
Connors was born in Mordialloc on 6 March 1937 and ordained as a priest on 23 July 1961. He was secretary to the Archbishop of Melbourne, Frank Little, from 1974 to 1976, then vicar-general of the Archdiocese of Melbourne until 1987. He was consecrated as the titular bishop of Temuniana in 1987 and appointed Bishop of Ballarat on 30 May 1997. Pope Benedict XVI accepted his resignation on 1 August 2012, not long after he reached the standard retirement age of 75. His retirement was described as "early" because he had anticipated that the search for his successor would require him to remain bishop for another year.

In 2015, Connors admitted to the Royal Commission into Institutional Responses to Child Sexual Abuse that he had failed to respond to reports of sexual abuse while Vicar General and Auxiliary Bishop, and that there was no excuse for failing to escalate complaints and allegations against priests under his charge. The royal commission confirmed that an early leaked police report, written by Ballarat Detective Kevin Carson, said the church seemed to have known about high rates of suicides linked to abuse by convicted child sex offenders Brother Robert Charles Best and Father Gerald Ridsdale, and others, but had remained silent.

In 2013, he had also told the Commission that his predecessor in Ballarat, Bishop Ronald Mulkearns, had shown great naivety in moving priests from one parish to another when they were known to have abused children.

A wing at Damascus College, constructed in 2012 for year 9 and 10 students, was named after Connors. This naming is now under review by the school following the findings from the Royal Commission.

See also

Roman Catholic Church in Australia

References

Roman Catholic bishops of Ballarat
1937 births
Living people
Catholic Church sexual abuse scandals in Australia
20th-century Roman Catholic bishops in Australia
Roman Catholic bishops of Melbourne
People from Mordialloc, Victoria
Religious leaders from Melbourne